HMS Kelly (pennant number F01) was a K-class destroyer of the British Royal Navy, and flotilla leader of her class. She served through the early years of the Second World War; in Home Waters, off Norway and in the Mediterranean. Throughout her service, Kelly was commanded by Lord Louis Mountbatten, as commander (Captain (D)) of the 5th Destroyer Flotilla.  She was lost in action in 1941 during the Battle of Crete.

Kelly was built by Hawthorn Leslie and Company at Hebburn on the River Tyne. She was laid down on 26 August 1937, launched on 25 October 1938 and commissioned on 23 August 1939, just 11 days before commencement of hostilities. She was named after Admiral of the Fleet Sir John Kelly.

Service

Home Waters (1939)
On the outbreak of the Second World War in September 1939, the Duke and Duchess of Windsor were brought from France, where they were living, back to Britain on board HMS Kelly.

On the afternoon of 14 December 1939, the tanker  struck a mine laid by German destroyers off the Tyne Estuary. During the operation, Kelly also struck a mine and sustained damage to her hull. While Mohawk put a party aboard Atheltemplar, and Joffre and Langton took the tanker under tow, Kelly herself was taken in tow by Great Emperor and returned to the Tyne. Reaching the Tyne just before midnight, Kelly was assisted upriver by the tugs Robert Redhead and Washington. She was towed to Hawthorn Leslie's yard for repairs, which took just a little over three months.

This was the second of Kellys misfortunes, having just returned to active service after a month in dry dock following storm damage. Repairs were completed on 28 February 1940, and Kelly returned to the fray.  Astonishingly, she was involved in a collision with  just two days later on 2 March, necessitating a further 8 weeks in dry dock, this time on the Thames. She was released on 27 April, in time to assist with the evacuation of allied forces from Namsos.

Norwegian campaign (1940)

On the night 9 May/10 May 1940, during the Battle of Norway, Kelly was torpedoed amidships by the German E-boat S 31, under command of Oberleutnant zur See Hermann Opdenhoff (for which action Oblt.z.S. Opdenhoff was awarded the Knight's Cross). Severely damaged, she was taken under tow by the tug Great Emperor and for four days she was attacked by E-boats and bombers as she struggled back to port at three knots. The Navy Controller wrote that she survived "not only by the good seamanship of the officers and men but also on account of the excellent workmanship which ensured the watertightness of the other compartments. A single defective rivet might have finished her." She was repaired and returned to service.

On return to Hebburn shipyard, she was de-commissioned before undergoing extensive repairs; she was not fit for active service until December 1940. Her bad luck had seen her on active service for less than two weeks over the previous 14 months.

Kelly re-joined 5th Flotilla after re-commissioning in December 1940; after working-up trials and some service in the Channel, she and 5th Flotilla sailed for the Mediterranean, arriving at Malta in April 1941.

Mediterranean (1941)

She arrived in Malta on the 28th and was deployed with her flotilla to join Force K for attacks on Axis shipping to North Africa.

On 10 May she led the destroyers to bombard Benghazi before returning to Malta. On 21 May she was despatched to Crete with Kashmir and Kipling and began patrols north of the island the next day.

On 23 May, during the evacuation of Crete, she was bombed and sunk, with half her crew killed. Kelly did succeed in shooting down three of the attacking Stukas, while another was badly damaged and crashed upon returning to base. The survivors were deeply affected by the loss of their ship; Mountbatten shared their loss and tried to console the ship's company by reminding them all that "we didn't leave the Kelly, the Kelly left us!"

Legacy
The 1942 film In Which We Serve starring Noël Coward and John Mills and telling the story of "HMS Torrin", is based on the career of Kelly. The HMS Kelly Association hosts reunions and commemorations. Notable supporters of the association have included Charles III and Sir John Mills.
In Hebburn, the town in South Tyneside where HMS Kelly was built there remains a public house by the name of "The Kelly" while the local Tyne & Wear metro station features artwork depicting the ship herself, demonstrating that the story of HMS Kelly and her crew is not forgotten and is still a source of civic pride in the town.

Battle Honours
 Atlantic (1939)
 Norway (1940)
 Mediterranean (1941)
 Crete (1941)

References

Bibliography

External links

The Man I Never Knew on HMS Kelly – BBC People's War 12 June 2005
HMS Kelly on naval-history.net

 

J, K and N-class destroyers of the Royal Navy
Ships built on the River Tyne
1938 ships
World War II destroyers of the United Kingdom
World War II shipwrecks in the Mediterranean Sea
Ships sunk by aircraft during the Battle of Crete
Maritime incidents in December 1939
Maritime incidents in May 1941
Ships sunk by German aircraft
Destroyers sunk by aircraft
Shipwrecks of Greece